Edgar Perez (born February 7, 1974) is an American-Peruvian business author, keynote speaker and corporate trainer who has spoken at a number of academic and professional institutions. He is the author of The Speed Traders and Knightmare on Wall Street, and has been interviewed internationally on the topics of artificial intelligence and deep learning, quantum computing, cybersecurity and high-frequency trading. He currently lives in New York City.

Education
Perez was born in Lima, Peru. From 1990 to 1994, he attended Facultad de Ingeniería Industrial y de Sistemas (Universidad Nacional de Ingeniería), earning a B.S. in Systems Engineering; he was elected there as president of the students’ center. Later, he was the youngest graduate ever to receive a Masters in Management from Universidad ESAN in 1997. He later attended Columbia Business School and received his M.B.A. in Finance and Management.

He speaks English and Spanish.

Additional Affiliations
Perez is a Council Member of the Gerson Lehrman Group (GLG) and Guidepoint Global Advisors, and fellow with the Ponemon Institute . He is a former consultant with McKinsey & Company, senior consultant with IBM Global Services, and vice president at Citigroup.

Career
Perez is a keynote speaker and corporate trainer on cutting-edge technologies and their impact on business. He has addressed executives in the world's major financial centers in New York City, London, Sao Paulo, Santiago, Seoul, Singapore, Kuala Lumpur, Stockholm, Warsaw, Kyiv, Beijing and Hong Kong.

He has been featured in a number of interviews to discuss topics including high-frequency trading, financial regulation and international economics.  He has been interviewed by CNBC (Cash Flow and Squawk Box), China Central Television (China Business News), Bankier.pl,  and TheStreet.com,. He has been featured in articles by The Wall Street Journal, The New York Times, The Star, Dallas Morning News, Valor Economico (Portuguese),  and Caixin (Chinese),.

He has presented before a number of institutions including universities (Coumbia, Harvard, MIT, NYU, Universidad Nacional de Ingeniería, and Peking University) and other professional institutions.

Works
Perez's first book was published in 2011, The Speed Traders: An Insider’s Look at the New High-Frequency Trading Phenomenon That is Transforming the Investing World. It details the evolution of high-frequency trading with a chronological account, as well as details of some of the public misconceptions around the 2010 Flash Crash. The book includes a thorough discussion of the interaction between high frequency traders and retail and institutional investors as well as detailed interviews with practitioners from American and European firms.

On August 1, 2013, Perez released his second book, Knightmare on Wall Street: The Rise and Fall of Knight Capital and the Biggest Risk for Financial Markets. It is an account of the hours following Knight Capital's August 1, 2012 trading disruption, which led to a $400 million rescue by Jefferies, Blackstone Group, GETCO, Stifel Financial, TD Ameritrade and Stephens. Perez's book reviews the initial years of Knight Capital since its founding in 1995 by Walter Raquet and Kenneth Pasternak, and closes with the acquisition of the company by GETCO, before being renamed KCG Holdings.

References

External links
 Edgar Perez official website

1974 births
Living people
Peruvian emigrants to the United States
American business writers
Columbia Business School alumni
People from Lima
American educators
Citigroup employees
American finance and investment writers
American consulting businesspeople
21st-century American businesspeople
Businesspeople from New York City
McKinsey & Company people
IBM employees
National University of Engineering alumni